Strophopteryx is a genus of winter stoneflies in the family Taeniopterygidae. There are about seven described species in Strophopteryx.

Species
These seven species belong to the genus Strophopteryx:
 Strophopteryx appalachia Ricker & Ross, 1975
 Strophopteryx arkansae Ricker & Ross, 1975
 Strophopteryx cucullata Frison, 1934
 Strophopteryx fasciata (Burmeister, 1839) (mottled willowfly)
 Strophopteryx limata (Frison, 1942)
 Strophopteryx nohirae (Okamoto, 1922)
 Strophopteryx rickeri Zhiltzova, 1976

References

Further reading

 
 

Taeniopterygidae
Articles created by Qbugbot